Elin Bergblom (born 18 January 1982) is a Swedish badminton player. Bergblom started her junior career in Täby Badmintonförening, and won her first national junior title in 1995 in the girls' and mixed doubles event. she represented her country competed at the 1999 European Youth Summer Olympic in Esbjerg, Denmark. Bergblom won the Swedish National senior title 9 times from 2002 to 2012, 5 in women's doubles, 3 in mixed doubles and once in women's singles event. Throughout her career, she ever been played for the Uppsala KFUM. She won the bronze medals at the 2006 and 2008 European Championship in the women's doubles event partnered with Johanna Persson.

Achievements

European Championships 
Women's doubles

BWF International Challenge/Series
Women's doubles

Mixed doubles

 BWF International Challenge tournament
 BWF International Series tournament

References

External links
Profile at expressen.se

Living people
1982 births
People from Knivsta Municipality
Swedish female badminton players
Sportspeople from Uppsala County
21st-century Swedish women